Wynand Christo Pienaar (born 5 August 1989) is a South African rugby union player, currently playing with the . His regular position is fullback.

Career

Youth and varsity rugby

He also played in the Under-18 Craven Week tournament twice – in 2006 and in 2007. In 2006, he was a member of the  squad that played in the Under-19 Provincial Championship (as a 17-year-old) and the following year he played for the  side in the 2007 Under-21 Provincial Championship.

Pienaar then made the move to Durban to join the  Academy. He played for the  side in the 2008 Under-19 Provincial Championship and for the  side in the 2010 Under-21 Provincial Championship. Despite being named to the  Vodacom Cup squads in 2010 and 2011, he failed to make a first class appearance for them.

Boland Cavaliers

Griffons

Pienaar was a key member of their 2014 Currie Cup First Division-winning side. He played off the bench in the final and helped the Griffons win the match 23–21 to win their first trophy for six years.

At the start of 2016, Pienaar was diagnosed with phase two Hodgkin's lymphoma and had to undergo chemotherapy every fortnight for six months. He beat the cancer and returned to full training with the Griffons after again being contracted for the 2017 season.

References

1989 births
Living people
Boland Cavaliers players
Griffons (rugby union) players
Rugby union fullbacks
Rugby union players from Welkom
South African rugby union players